Peter Corbett may refer to:
Peter Corbett (cricketer)
Peter Edgar Corbett, art historian
Peter Corbett (Big Brother)
Peter Corbett (actor) in Always Greener